Gavril Serfözö (25 September 1926 – 16 May 2002) was a Romanian footballer. He competed in the men's tournament at the 1952 Summer Olympics.

Honours
CA Oradea
Liga I: 1948–49
CCA București
Cupa României: 1948–49, 1950
UTA Arad
Liga I: 1954
Cupa României: 1953

References

External links

1926 births
2002 deaths
Sportspeople from Oradea
Romanian footballers
Romania international footballers
Olympic footballers of Romania
Footballers at the 1952 Summer Olympics
Association football midfielders
Liga I players
Liga II players
CA Oradea players
FC Steaua București players
FC UTA Arad players
CSM Reșița players
FC CFR Timișoara players